Luis Fernando Castillo Méndez (December 4, 1922 - October 29, 2009) was a Venezuelan Independent Catholic priest who rose to the leadership of the Brazilian Catholic Apostolic Church (ICAB). Castillo Méndez was arguably the second or third 'Patriarch' of ICAB and its 48 dioceses, though none of his predecessors used that title. He was also the nominal head of the Iglesias Catolicas Apostolicas Nacionales (ICAN) and the Worldwide Communion of Catholic Apostolic National Churches (WCCAC), which were attempts to form an international association of Independent Catholic churches.

Although he had little formal education, Castillo Méndez contrived to be ordained priest on August 10, 1944, though he was immediately censured and was at no point recognized as a Roman Catholic priest. On March 8, 1947, Castillo Méndez became the founder of the independent Venezuelan Catholic Apostolic Church (ICAV - Iglesia Católica Apostólica Venezolana). Castillo Méndez was subsequently excommunicated by the Holy See. On May 3, 1948 he was consecrated a bishop and Patriarch for the Venezuelan Catholic Apostolic Church by the bishop Carlos Duarte Costa (excommunicated former Roman Catholic bishop of Botucatu, Brazil) in the Panama Canal Zone. Castillo Méndez later succeeded Duarte Costa and became the President of the Episcopal Council of ICAB in 1982. He died on October 29, 2009. He was the first and last Patriarch of ICAN.

Biography

Early life and ministry
Luis Fernando Castillo Méndez was born in Caracas, Venezuela on December 4, 1922 and baptized on December 22 in the Parish of Saint John the Baptist. His parents were Castillo Lopéz and Carmen Méndez and had five siblings: Ramón, Domingo, Cecilia, José de Jesús and Antonio Obdulio. He was twice expelled from Roman Catholic seminaries, each after only one term, was subsequently jailed in 1938 for impersonating a priest, and was suspected of having a pathological fixation with the priesthood. He later made his way to Spain, where he presented fabricated documents apparently entitling him to be ordained priest, and on August 10, 1944, Bishop Valentín Comellas y Santamaría of Solsona ordained him to the priesthood in the Cathedral of Santa Maria. The Roman Catholic authorities immediately rejected his claim to the priesthood, and after being detained by the police he agreed to leave the country.

Upon returning to Venezuela, at a time of massive upheaval in the country, Castillo Méndez claimed to have been involved in a movement called the Curas Criollos ("Native Priests" or literally "Creole Priests"). Having learned through periodicals about the church reform movement led by the left-wing government critic and Vatican critic Dom Carlos Duarte Costa (former Roman Catholic bishop of Botucatu) in Brazil and the founder of the Brazilian Catholic Apostolic Church (separated from the Holy See and the Roman Catholic Church) in 1945, Castillo Méndez entered into correspondence with Duarte Costa. Meanwhile, as the Roman Catholic Church sought to affirm its place in society with the foundation of a new Christian Social political party, anticlerical forces from the Democratic Action and Communist parties saw it as in their interests to encourage the young 'rebel' priest, in order to discredit and disrupt the Catholic Church's plans.

Foundation of the Venezuelan Catholic Apostolic Church

Consequently, in 1947 Castillo Méndez and three other clergy formally established the "Venezuelan Catholic Apostolic Church". Like the Brazilian Catholic church led by its first Bishop, Dom Carlos Duarte Costa, the Venezuelan church was to be independent of the Vatican, would use Spanish instead of Latin in the liturgy, and would permit its clergy to marry. Castillo Méndez officially registered the new church with the Interior Ministry in early 1947, with signed affidavits from 250 fellow priests who had unanimously elected him Bishop of Caracas. The Minister of Interior immediately ordered the federal police to ensure that Castillo Méndez did not wear the vestments or insignia of the office of a bishop. The new church did receive public approval from the Democratic Action and Communist parties.

On March 8, 1947 Castillo Méndez and the other three founders of the Venezuelan independent church were formally excommunicated from the Roman Catholic Church. The Roman Catholic archbishop, Lucas Guillermo Castillo, stated in the excommunication directive that the four priests had "violated fundamental dogma of the Roman Catholic Church and held concepts blasphemous, as well as several which are offensive to the person and authority of the Roman Pope Pius XII." The notice further stated that any Catholics who supported this new church would also be excommunicated.

Entry into the Brazilian Catholic Apostolic Church

In 1947 Castillo Méndez was serving as pastor of St. Teresa's (National Catholic, not Roman Catholic) parish in Caracas. Having been elected leader by his fellow priests in the nascent national church, he sought to go to Brazil to receive episcopal consecration from Duarte Costa. However, the Venezuelan government did not consent to this trip, nor would it allow Duarte Costa to enter Venezuela. In the end, Castillo Méndez and Carlos Duarte Costa made arrangements to meet in the Panama Canal Zone, a territory under the jurisdiction of the United States, which did not have formal diplomatic relations with the Vatican at that time. On May 3, 1948, Costa consecrated Castillo Méndez as a bishop, with the title of Bishop of Caracas and Primate of Venezuela.

With an abrupt change of government, Castillo Méndez fled to Brazil on June 21, 1950, where he was installed by Duarte Costa as parish vicar and diocesan bishop of Uberlandia in the state of Minas Gerais. In 1957 he was moved to Rio de Janeiro where he served as auxiliary bishop. He was reassigned to Brasília in 1960 where he served as diocesan bishop of the state of Goias. It is worth noting that the erection of the Diocese of Brasília predated that of the Roman Catholic archdiocese by five years, as a result of which the Roman Catholic hierarchy were forced to recognize, and never able to challenge, the title of Bishop of Brasília.  In 1961 he acquired Brazilian citizenship.

Primacy

Upon Bishop Duarte Costa's death in 1961, leadership of the Brazilian Catholic Apostolic Church was apparently in a flux for several years, with several individuals leading or claiming to lead the church, often for very brief periods of time. Antidio Jose Vargas initially took over as General Supervisor, followed by Pedro dos Santos Silva as first President of the Episcopal Council, and Luigi Mascolo in the 1970's. By 1982 Castillo Mendez was undisputed leader, elected that year as president of the Episcopal Council of ICAB. In 1988 he was officially designated as the "Patriarch of ICAB", and in 1990 he was given the title of "Patriarch of ICAN (union of National Catholic Apostolic Churches)", which then became the WCCAC, the church's international communion, a position which he held until his death in 2009.

It is sometimes said that Castillo Mendez used the Tridentine Pontifical in the vernacular for all episcopal consecrations, but this is disputed: under Castillo Mendez's leadership, and previously, ICAB's rites were often amended or reformed; furthermore, the Tridentine rite in an unauthorised vernacular form could no longer be considered the Tridentine rite. Like the Eastern Orthodox Church and other Christian churches, he denied papal infallibility and did not support obligatory priestly celibacy. Castillo Mendez acquired a Papal blessing by Pope John Paul II, such as may be requested by any individual for a donation.

Personal life
Despite the Brazilian Catholic Apostolic Church allowing priests and the clergy to marry, Castillo Méndez never married. He was said to recite the rosary several times every day; a practice that was abolished by the Church under Duarte Costa. Castillo Méndez wore the Church's gray cassock with red piping but after his designation as, Patriarch of ICAB, he began wearing an off-white cassock and zucchetto.

Death
On the morning of October 29, 2009, Castillo Mendez suffered a severe heart attack. He was rushed to the hospital and lost consciousness; he was declared dead at approximately 9:00 am, at the age of 86, in Brasilia, Brazil. He was the last living bishop consecrated by Carlos Duarte Costa. His Funeral Mass took place at the Cathedral of Our Lady of the Miraculous Medal in Brasilia, where his body was laid to rest; attending were the Presiding Bishop of ICAB Josivaldo Perreira de Oliveira and bishops of the Episcopal Council and a large gathering of clergy and families.

Note on his name
As a native of Venezuela, Castillo Méndez's family name (patronym) is "Castillo", with "Méndez" being his mother's family name. In Spanish-speaking countries, people normally have two surnames. One is inherited from the father, the other from the mother. The father's surname is written before the mother's surname and, when addressing a person formally, one usually uses the father's surname (e.g. "Señor Castillo"). (See article Spanish naming customs)

However, as an immigrant to Brazil, where the custom is to place the father's surname in the final position, Castillo Méndez was normally addressed as "Méndez", even though this is technically his mother's surname.

Another Brazilian custom is to address bishops and high-ranking church officials with the honorific title of "Dom" followed by the individual's first name. Thus Castillo Méndez was often addressed as "Dom Luis".

See also
 Carlos Duarte Costa 
 Venezuelan Catholic Apostolic Church
 Brazilian Catholic Apostolic Church
 Josivaldo Perriera

References

1922 births
2009 deaths
People from Caracas
Brazilian people of Venezuelan descent
Venezuelan Christians
Venezuelan Roman Catholic priests
People excommunicated by the Catholic Church
Primates of the Brazilian Catholic Apostolic Church
Independent Catholic patriarchs
People with acquired Brazilian citizenship
Naturalized citizens of Brazil
20th-century Roman Catholic priests